Richard Norcom "Dick" Lucas (July 20, 1920 – August 27, 1997) was an American animator and storyboard artist, noteworthy as part of Walt Disney Productions.

Biography 
Lucas studied at the Chouinard Art Institute, and in 1942, he was hired to work at the Disney Studios based on a personal recommendation from Walt Disney. There, he worked as an inbetweener and character animator on The Three Caballeros (1944), Cinderella, Alice in Wonderland (1951), Peter Pan (1953), Lady and the Tramp (1955), The Sword in the Stone (1963), The Jungle Book (1967) and The Rescuers (1977). Lucas also worked as an effects animator for One Hundred and One Dalmatians (1961) and The Fox and the Hound (1981), and as a storyboard artist for the short film Winnie the Pooh and the Honey Tree (1966). In addition, he built superb scale models for the animators in the Nine Old Men the way Bob Jones, Wah Chang, Lorna Soderstrom and Duke Russell had done for Pinocchio (1940). Lucas retired from Disney in 1982.  

On August 27, 1997, Lucas died at his home in Los Osos, California, aged 77.

Filmography

References

External links
 

1920 births
1997 deaths
American animators
American storyboard artists
Chouinard Art Institute alumni
People from Los Angeles
Special effects people
Walt Disney Animation Studios people